Blu-code is a professional Blu-ray authoring software, supporting H.264 and MPEG-2 encoding. Blu-code can support a large-scale distributed processing system deploying a number of PCs for real-time encoding or run on a single PC.

See also
 H.264/MPEG-4 AVC
 MPEG-4
 MPEG-2
 Codec
 x264

References

External links
 http://www.sonycreativesoftware.com/blucode
 http://pro.sony.com/bbsc/ssr/cat-editing/cat-encodingandauthoring/product-BAEVX1000/
 https://web.archive.org/web/20090527235612/http://www.sonic.com/products/Professional/SonyBlucode/quicklook.aspx
 http://www.blu-ray.com/news/?id=2801
 http://www.governmentvideo.com/article/83240
 https://web.archive.org/web/20091006133857/http://www.digitalmedia.com.au/web/index.php?option=com_content&view=article&id=1306%3Asony-updates-blu-code-for-blu-ray-compliant-hd&catid=35%3Adigital-video&Itemid=30
 http://www.sonycreativesoftware.com/products/pdf/Blu-code_Brochure.pdf

Video codecs